This article covers streets in Los Angeles, California between and including 11th Street and 40th Street. Major streets have their own linked articles; minor streets are discussed here.

These streets run parallel to each other, roughly east–west.

Streets change from west to east (for instance West 11th Street to East 11th Street) at Main Street.

Washington, 26th, and 37th/Bandini have crossings over the Los Angeles River

Details

11th Street
11th Street has been renamed Chick Hearn Court between L. A. Live Way and Figueroa Street.

13th Street
see Pico Boulevard

16th Street
see Venice Boulevard

19th Street
see Washington Boulevard (Los Angeles)

23rd Street
One Metro E Line station:
LATTC/Orthopedic Institution

26th Street
26th Street has been renamed Adams Boulevard west of Long Beach Avenue.  Metro Local line 37 runs on West Adams Boulevard, and Metro Local line 55 run on East Adams Boulevard.  East of Santa Fe Avenue, 26th Street is an industrial street that crosses the Los Angeles River, parallels the BNSF Railyard, and runs into Commerce.

32nd and 33rd Streets
These numbers are skipped West of USC.  31st is the first numbered street north of Jefferson Boulevard, and 35th is the next street south of it

34th Street
34th Street has been renamed Jefferson Boulevard.

37th Street
37th Street is renamed Bandini Boulevard east of the Los Angeles River, which it crosses.

40th Street

40th Street had been renamed Santa Barbara Avenue, which has itself been renamed Martin Luther King, Jr. Boulevard in 1983. It is served by Metro Local line 40.

See also
Los Angeles streets, 1–10
Los Angeles streets, 41–250
Los Angeles avenues
List of streets in Los Angeles

References

11
Los Angeles 11
Streets 11